Annibale D'Afflitto (died 1638) was a Roman Catholic prelate who served as Archbishop of Reggio Calabria (1593–1638). He descends from the princely House d’Afflitto.

Biography
On 15 November 1593, Annibale D'Afflitto was appointed during the papacy of Pope Clement VIII as Archbishop of Reggio Calabria.
On 30 November 1593, he was consecrated bishop by Alfonso Gesualdo di Conza, Cardinal-Bishop of Ostia e Velletri, with Giulio Ottinelli, Bishop of Fano, and Cristóbal Senmanat y Robuster, Bishop Emeritus of Orihuela, serving as co-consecrators. 
He served as Archbishop of Reggio Calabria until his death on 1 April 1638.

References

External links and additional sources
 (for Chronology of Bishops) 
 (for Chronology of Bishops) 

17th-century Roman Catholic archbishops in the Kingdom of Naples
Bishops appointed by Pope Clement VIII
1638 deaths